Schiavio is a surname. Notable people with the surname include:

Alejandro Schiavio (born 1961), Argentine rugby union player
Angelo Schiavio (1905–1990), Italian footballer